At the 2011 Pan Arab Games, the cue sports events were held at Qatar Billiards and Snooker Federation in Doha, Qatar from 11–22 December. A total of 5 events were contested.

Medal summary

Men

Medal table

References

External links
Cue Sports at official website

Pan Arab Games
Events at the 2011 Pan Arab Games
Pan Arab Games
2011 Pan Arab Games
Cue sports in Qatar